Baytown Christian Academy is a private Christian primary and secondary school located in Baytown, Texas. The school's administrative offices and campus are together. The school was established in 1979.

History
Previously, the main campus only had grades 4-12, while the campus for PK-3 through 3rd grades was located at Baker Road Baptist Church in Baytown.

Athletics
Baytown Christian Academy has a six-man football team.

References

Christian schools in Texas
Private K-12 schools in Harris County, Texas
Baytown, Texas
Greater Houston
Galveston Bay Area
Educational institutions established in 1979
1979 establishments in Texas